Projector is a 19th-century term in United States patent law meaning the original true inventor.  "True inventor" at the time meant the first inventor to reduce an invention to practice.

As a synonym for promoter, e.g. in the phrase "railway projectors", the term was used in a derogatory fashion in a 1790 document. In that discussion of needed changes in the patent act, 'projector' described someone who overzealously promotes an invention.

See also
Corporate promoter
Inventor (patent)
Patent medicine
Patent troll

References

United States patent law